The NCAA Women's Soccer Championship refers to one of three championships in women's soccer organized by the National Collegiate Athletic Association (NCAA):

NCAA Division I Women's Soccer Championship, 1982–present
NCAA Division II Women's Soccer Championship, 1988–present
NCAA Division III Women's Soccer Championship, 1986–present

See also
AIAW Champions#Soccer

 
College soccer competitions in the United States
Women's soccer leagues in the United States
College women's soccer in the United States